Tony Annan is an English professional football head coach.

Coaching career
Born in Newcastle upon Tyne, Annan moved to the United States and began coaching in the Atlanta, Georgia area. At one point he cofounded the Georgia United development academy. In December 2016, it was announced that Annan had joined new expansion Major League Soccer side Atlanta United as the club's academy director.

Atlanta United 2
On 27 July 2020, it was announced that Annan would take over as interim head coach of Atlanta United 2, Atlanta United's reserve side which plays in the USL Championship. Annan was taking over from Stephen Glass, who was promoted to interim head coach of Atlanta United after Frank de Boer left the club.

His first match as head coach was on 29 July 2020 in the league against Miami. Atlanta United 2 won the match 4–3.

University of South Carolina
On 22 April 2021, Annan was named head coach of the men's soccer team at the University of South Carolina.

Coaching statistics

References

External links
Profile at the Atlanta United website

Living people
Atlanta United 2 coaches
South Carolina Gamecocks men's soccer coaches
English football managers
Year of birth missing (living people)
English expatriate sportspeople in the United States
Expatriate soccer managers in the United States
Atlanta United FC non-playing staff
Atlanta Silverbacks coaches
English expatriate footballers
English expatriate football managers
Expatriate soccer players in the United States
Footballers from Newcastle upon Tyne
Life University alumni
College men's soccer players in the United States
Association footballers not categorized by position
English footballers